Dog racing commonly refers to greyhound racing.

Dog racing or dog race may also refer to:

 Sled dog racing, a winter dog sport involving the timed competition of teams of sleddogs that pull a sled
 Dachshund racing, a popular, yet controversial sporting event for dachshunds
 Dog scootering, a sport where one or more dogs pull a human riding an unmotorized kick scooter
 Lure coursing, a dog sport that involves chasing a mechanically operated lure
 Skijoring, a winter sport that involves a human on skis being pulled by a dog or horse

See also
Coursing, a form of hunting where dogs are used to chase down game